A Beginning, a Detour, an Open Ending is a 2008 album by Tina Dico. It is Dico's fifth studio album comprising a boxset of three EPs (shorter albums with 6–7 songs on each) recorded in March 2007, January 2008 and June 2008.

Track listing
Source: Amazon

References

2008 albums
Tina Dico albums